"Then I'll Be Happy" is a jazz standard composed by Cliff Friend, with lyrics by Lew Brown and Sidney Clare. It was first published in 1925. A popular recording in 1926 was by Whispering Jack Smith.

Other recordings
Peggy Lee - recorded December 26, 1947 as "I Wanna Go Where You Go (Then I'll Be Happy)".
Bing Crosby recorded the song in 1956 for use on his radio show and it was subsequently included in the box set The Bing Crosby CBS Radio Recordings (1954-56) issued by Mosaic Records (catalog MD7-245) in 2009. 
Eddie Fisher - a single release in 1955.
Dinah Shore - a single release in 1955. 
Jaye P. Morgan - for her album Just You, Just Me (1958).
Robert Goulet - included in his album The Wonderful World of Love (1962).

See also
 List of 1920s jazz standards

References

1925 songs
1920s jazz standards
Peggy Lee songs
Whispering Jack Smith songs
Songs with lyrics by Sidney Clare
Songs with lyrics by Lew Brown
Songs with music by Cliff Friend